Charanjit Singh is an Indian politician and eye surgeon. He is the MLA from Chamkaur Sahib Assembly constituency. He is a member of the Aam Aadmi Party.

Member of Legislative Assembly
He represents the Chamkaur Sahib Assembly constituency as MLA in Punjab Assembly. The Aam Aadmi Party gained a strong 79% majority in the sixteenth Punjab Legislative Assembly by winning 92 out of 117 seats in the 2022 Punjab Legislative Assembly election. MP Bhagwant Mann was sworn in as Chief Minister on 16 March 2022.

Committee assignments of Punjab Legislative Assembly
Member (2022–23) Committee on Public Accounts
Member (2022–23) Committee on Privileges

Electoral performance

References

External links
 

Living people
Punjab, India MLAs 2022–2027
Aam Aadmi Party politicians from Punjab, India
People from Rupnagar district
Year of birth missing (living people)
Aam Aadmi Party candidates in the 2017 Punjab Legislative Assembly election